Panther Branch may refer to:

Panther Branch (Ottery Creek), a stream in Missouri
Panther Branch (Hyco Creek tributary), a stream in Caswell County, North Carolina
Panther Branch (Duck River), a stream in Tennessee

See also
Panther Branch Township, Wake County, North Carolina